Computer World is the eighth studio album by German electronic band Kraftwerk, released on 10 May 1981.

The album deals with the themes of the rise of computers within society. In keeping with the album's concept, Kraftwerk showcased their music on an ambitious world tour. The compositions are credited to Ralf Hütter, Florian Schneider, and Karl Bartos. As was the case with the two previous albums, Computer World was released in both German- and English-language editions.

Concept and recording
Computer World has been described as a futuristic conceptual work that predicts the presence of computer technology in every day life. Featuring themes such as home computers and digital communication, the album has been seen as both a celebration of computer technology as well as a warning about its potential to exert power on society with social control and digital surveillance. Despite its theme, the production of the album was completely analogue and did not involve any computer technology.

Artwork
The cover shows a computer terminal (apparently based on one made by the Hazeltine Corporation) displaying the heads of the four band members.

The inner sleeve artwork, created by Emil Schult and photographed by Günter Fröhling, depicts four slightly robotic-looking mannequins (representing the band members engaged in studio activities: performing, recording, mixing), similar to the artwork of the previous album, The Man-Machine, also created by Fröhling. In two photos, the mannequin representing Karl Bartos is seen playing a Stylophone, an instrument which is featured on the track "Pocket Calculator".

Release

It was certified silver by the British Phonographic Industry (BPI) on 12 February 1982 for shipments in excess of 60,000 copies.

The track "Computer Love" was released as a seven-inch single in the UK, in July 1981, backed with "The Model", from the group's previous album The Man-Machine. The single reached  in the charts. In November 1981 the two songs were reissued as a double A-side twelve-inch single, and reached  on the UK Singles Chart in February 1982, although "The Model" received the most airplay.

"Pocket Calculator" was released as a seven-inch single in the USA by Warner Brothers in 1981, pressed on a fluorescent yellow/lime vinyl, matching the color of the album cover. The flip side featured the Japanese version of "Pocket Calculator," "Dentaku".

"Computerwelt" was remixed in 1982 as a dance version with additional bass and percussion sounds. It was released in January 1982 as a twelve-inch vinyl single only in Germany. The original track was nominated for a Grammy Award for Best Rock Instrumental Performance in 1982. "Computer World" was also chosen by the BBC for use in the titles of their UK computer literacy project, The Computer Programme.

Kraftwerk issued several different versions of the single "Pocket Calculator" in different languages: namely, German ("Taschenrechner"), French ("Mini Calculateur"), Japanese ("Dentaku", or 電卓), and Italian ("Mini Calcolatore").

Critical reception

Computer World was ranked the second best album of 1981 by NME.

In 2018, Computer World was listed by Pitchfork as the 18th best album of the 1980s. Pitchfork listed the track "Computer Love" as the 53rd best song of the 1980s. Rolling Stone named Computer World the 10th greatest EDM album of all time in 2012.

1981 Computer World tour 

Following the release of the Computer World album, Kraftwerk went on a subsequent tour, that started on 24 May 1981 and ended on 14 December 1981.

Legacy
Computer World maintains a distinct influence over subsequent releases across a multitude of genres; this influence is particularly noticeable in early and contemporary hip-hop and rap.

In 1982, American DJ and rapper Afrika Bambaataa wrote the song "Planet Rock" and recorded chords inspired from Trans-Europe Express. The song's lyrics also included the Japanese number counting "Ichi Ni San Shi" from Kraftwerk's "Numbers".

Cybotron's 1983 release "Clear," from the album Enter, contains multiple auditory elements of Computer World: the musical refrain closely resembles parts of "Home Computer" and "It's More Fun to Compute;" additionally, the track contains musical allusions to other Kraftwerk tracks.

Señor Coconut y su Conjunto, an electronic project of German musician Uwe Schmidt which initially covered Kraftwerk's songs, published a merengue-styled version of "It's More Fun to Compute" in their first LP El Baile Alemán, wrongly labeled as "Homecomputer" on the sleeve.

Coldplay used the main riff from "Computer Love" in their song "Talk" from their 2005 album X&Y. La Roux used the main riff from "Computer Love" in their song "I'm Not Your Toy" from their debut album.

Ricardo Villalobos' track "Lugom-IX" from the 2006 album Salvador uses prominently the riff from "Computer World".

Fergie's track "Fergalicious," from her 2006 debut album The Dutchess, borrows heavily from two tracks on Computer World: the opening synth line from "It's More Fun to Compute," as well as the rhythmic component of J.J. Fad's "Supersonic," as the latter track's beat is based upon the Computer World track "Numbers." Arabian Prince, the co-producer of "Supersonic," has been vocal about his admiration of Kraftwerk.

"Home Computer" is used as background music in the Young Sheldon episode "A Computer, a Plastic Pony, and a Case of Beer".

LCD Soundsystem sampled "Home Computer" throughout the track, Disco Infiltrator.

DJ Hooligan (Da Hool) sampled The Mix version of "Home Computer" for the Underground and Cursed remix of the song "Scatman's World" by Scatman John.

Track listing

Personnel
The original 1981 sleeve notes are relatively unspecific regarding roles, merely listing all the equipment suppliers and technicians under the heading "Hardware" and the various other people involved, such as photographers, as "Software". By contrast, the 2009 remastered edition notes list the performer credits as the following:

Kraftwerk
Ralf Hütter – voice, vocoder, synthesizer, keyboards, Orchestron, Synthanorma Sequenzer, electronics, software
Florian Schneider – vocoder, speech synthesis, synthesizer, electronics, software
Karl Bartos – electronic drums, software
Wolfgang Flür – software

Technical
Ralf Hütter – mixing, cover, original artwork reconstruction, album concept, production
Florian Schneider – mixing, cover, album concept, production
Peter Bollis – hardware
Hermann J. Poertner – hardware
Gerd Rothe – hardware
Pit Franke – software
Karl Klefisch – software
Falk Kübler – software
Takeshi Shikura – software
Martin Tewis – software
Carol Martin – software
Tom Lanik – software
Doreen D'Agostino – software
Marvin Katz – software
Bob Krasnow – software
Günter Spachtholz – software
Joachim Dehmann – software
Emil Schult – cover
Günter Fröhling – photos
Johann Zambryski – original artwork reconstruction

Charts

Weekly charts

Year-end charts

Certifications

References

External links
 

1981 albums
Albums produced by Florian Schneider
Albums produced by Ralf Hütter
Concept albums
EMI Records albums
German-language albums
Kraftwerk albums
Warner Records albums